Ivan Vuković (Montenegrin Cyrillic: Иван Вуковић, born 9 February 1987) is a retired Montenegrin football forward who was last played for FK Iskra Danilovgrad. He is best known for his abilities as a striker but can also play as a supporting striker.

Club career
Vuković began his professional career at Montenegrin side FK Zeta signing for the club in 2003. During his second season at the club, Zeta had possibly the best season in their history. Zeta finished the 2004–05 season in third place in the First League of Serbia and Montenegro, just behind Belgrade powerhouses FK Partizan and Red Star Belgrade with Ivan leading the attack all season.

Budućnost
In 2006, Vuković moved to FK Budućnost Podgorica. Here he spent five season leading the club to four second places and one first place in the Montenegrin First Division. He scored 57 goals in 103 official appearances for the club. His last two seasons at the club (the 2009–10 and 2010–11 seasons) were particularly successful, scoring 39 goals in 60 appearances. He was awarded by the Football Association of Montenegro the recognition of "Footballer of the Year" in all domestic Montenegrin competition.

Hajduk Split
Due to his fine long term form, Croatian giants HNK Hajduk Split signed him from the club in the summer of 2011 for a reported fee of €425,000. On August 9, 2012, in the 2012-13 UEFA Europa League third qualifying round, he scored a remarkable goal against Internazionale.

Seongnam
In June 2013 he signed for Seongnam for a reported fee of €220,000 from Hajduk Split.

Mladost
In August 2014 he returned to Europe and joined Serbian top-flight side OFK Beograd. Same year he was transferred to Mladost Podgorica. He scored deciding goal against Neftchi which took Mladost to the second qualifying round of UEFA League Europa 2015.

Maccabi Netanya
In August 2015 Vuković signed a new contract for the Israeli club Maccabi Netanya penning one-year contract with option for two, but was released from the club after less than a month.

Back to Mladost
Upon return from Israel, Vuković trained with his previous club, Mladost. In the second half of the 2015–16 season, he officially signed a new contract with Mladost. In 2015–16 UEFA Europa League qualifiers, he scored decisive goal against Neftchi Baku which advanced Mladost to next round. Mladost became Montenegrin champions of 2015–16 season. After the season, Vuković have decided not to renew a contract.

International career
Vuković was previously a part of the Montenegrin national youth teams before advancing to the senior national team. His senior debut for Montenegro came on November 18, 2009 when he came in as a substitute for Milorad Peković in a friendly match against Belarus. It remained his sole international appearance.

References

External links

Ivan Vuković at FSCG website
 
 

1987 births
Living people
Footballers from Podgorica
Association football forwards
Serbia and Montenegro footballers
Montenegrin footballers
Montenegro international footballers
FK Zeta players
FK Budućnost Podgorica players
HNK Hajduk Split players
Seongnam FC players
OFK Beograd players
OFK Titograd players
Maccabi Netanya F.C. players
FK Lovćen players
FK Rabotnički players
OFK Grbalj players
Ivan Vukovic
FK Iskra Danilovgrad players
First League of Serbia and Montenegro players
Montenegrin First League players
Croatian Football League players
K League 1 players
Serbian SuperLiga players
Macedonian First Football League players
Ivan Vukovic
Montenegrin expatriate footballers
Montenegrin expatriate sportspeople in Croatia
Expatriate footballers in Croatia
Expatriate footballers in South Korea
Montenegrin expatriate sportspeople in South Korea
Expatriate footballers in Serbia
Montenegrin expatriate sportspeople in Serbia
Expatriate footballers in Israel
Montenegrin expatriate sportspeople in Israel
Expatriate footballers in North Macedonia
Montenegrin expatriate sportspeople in North Macedonia
Expatriate footballers in Thailand
Montenegrin expatriate sportspeople in Thailand